Psittacodrillia diversa is a species of sea snail, a marine gastropod mollusk in the family Horaiclavidae.

Description
The length of the shell attains 14 mm, its diameter 5.5 mm.

The biconic-claviform shell has about two whorls in the protoconch and five weakly convex whorls in the teleoconch. The shell shows 10 to 12 axial ribs on the early whorls and 9 to 11 on the penultimate whorl. The ribs only occupy the lower two-thirds of the whorl, the remainder being simple. The spiral striation is fine; that towards the base of the body whorl is a trifle coarser. The aperture is oblong. The siphonal canal is wide. The columella is slightly convex and has a moderately thick callus.  The shell is orange-red with darker red spots in the intervals on the whorls.

Distribution
This marine species occurs off Jeffrey's Bay - East Cape, South Africa

References

 Kilburn, R.N. & Rippey, E. (1982) Sea Shells of Southern Africa. Macmillan South Africa, Johannesburg, xi + 249 pp. page(s): 117
 R.N. Kilburn (1988), Turridae (Mollusca: Gastropoda) of southern Africa and Mozambique. Part 4. Subfamilies Drilliinae, Crassispirinae and Strictispirinae; Ann. Natal Mus. Vol. 29(1) pp. 167–320
 Steyn, D.G. & Lussi, M. (1998) Marine Shells of South Africa. An Illustrated Collector's Guide to Beached Shells. Ekogilde Publishers, Hartebeespoort, South Africa, ii + 264 pp.page(s): 152

External links
  Tucker, J.K. 2004 Catalog of recent and fossil turrids (Mollusca: Gastropoda). Zootaxa 682:1-1295.
 

Endemic fauna of South Africa
diversa